Akaroa County was one of the counties of New Zealand in the South Island. The council first met in Akaroa court house on 4 January 1877. In 1880 new offices were opened at Duvauchelle. It became part of Banks Peninsula District in 1989.

See also 
 List of former territorial authorities in New Zealand § Counties

References

External links 

 1891 map
 List of county archives

Counties of New Zealand
1876 establishments in New Zealand
1989 disestablishments in New Zealand